The 1921 Columbia Lions football team was an American football team that represented Columbia University as an independent during the 1918 college football season. In his second season, head coach Frank "Buck" O'Neill led the team to a 2–6 record, with the Lions outscored  by opponents.  

The team played most of its home games on South Field, part of the university's campus in Morningside Heights in Upper Manhattan.

Schedule

References

Columbia
Columbia Lions football seasons
Columbia Lions football